This is a list of people executed in Victoria. It lists people who were executed by British (and from 1901, Australian) authorities within the modern-day boundaries of Victoria. For people executed in other parts of Australia, see the sidebar.

1840s

Tunnerminnerwait – Hanged at Melbourne on 20 January 1842 for the murder of two whalers at Cape Paterson
Maulboyheenner – Hanged at Melbourne on 20 January 1842 for the murder of two whalers at Cape Paterson
Charles Ellis – Hanged at Melbourne Gaol on 28 June 1842 for "shooting with intent to maim or disable" ("The Plenty Trio")
Martin Fogarty – Bushranger. Hanged at Melbourne Gaol on 28 June 1842 for "shooting with intent to maim or disable" ("The Plenty Trio")
Daniel ("Yankee Jack") Jepps – Bushranger. Hanged at Melbourne Gaol on 28 June 1842 for "shooting with intent to maim or disable" ("The Plenty Trio")
Alkepurata ("Roger") – 5 September 1842 – From Port Fairy. Hanged at Melbourne for murder of Patrick Codd at Mount Rouse, Hamilton
Jeremiah Connell - 27 January 1847 – Hanged at Melbourne Gaol for the murder of Edward Martin at Buninyong
Bobby – 30 April 1847 – Hanged at Melbourne Gaol for the killing by spear of Andrew Beveridge at Piangil
Ptolemy – 30 April 1847 – Hanged at Melbourne Gaol for the killing by spear of Andrew Beveridge at Piangil
John ("Pretty Boy") Healey – 29 November 1847 – Hanged at Melbourne Gaol for the murder of Jemmy Ritchie at Tarraville, Gippsland
Augustus Dancey 19 – 1 August 1848 – Hanged at Melbourne Gaol for the murder of Matthew Luck at Stony Creek (Spotswood)

1850s

1850 to 1854
Patrick Kennedy – 1 October 1851 – Hanged at Melbourne Gaol for the murder of his wife Mary at Penshurst
James Barlow – 22 May 1852 – Hanged at Melbourne Gaol for murder by stabbing William Jones at a boarding house in Flinders Street, Melbourne
John Riches (Richie) – 3 November 1852 – Hanged at Melbourne Gaol for the murder of Harry Webb in the Black Forest, near Macedon
George Pinkerton – 4 April 1853 – Hanged at Melbourne Gaol for the murder of Bridget Smith, 8 months pregnant, and her one-year-old son Charles at Brighton
Aaron Durant – 11 July 1853 – Hanged at Melbourne Gaol for robbery with violence and sexual assault of Mr & Mrs John Wright at Bendigo
John Smith – 23 August 1853 – Hanged at Melbourne Gaol for Robbery With Violence at Fryer's Creek
Henry Turner – 23 August 1853 – Hanged at Melbourne Gaol for Robbery With Violence at Fryer's Creek
William Atkins (or Atkyns) – 3 October 1853 – Bushranger. Hanged at Melbourne Gaol for the robbery of the Private Escort, near Kalkallo
George ("Frenchy") Melville – 3 October 1853 – Bushranger. Hanged at Melbourne Gaol for the robbery of the Private Escort
George Wilson – 3 October 1853 – Bushranger. Hanged at Melbourne Gaol for the robbery of an Escort
Patrick O'Connor (or Connor) – 24 October 1853 – Bushranger. Hanged at Melbourne Gaol for the attempted murder of Edward Thompson near Kilmore
Henry Bradley – 24 October 1853 – Bushranger. Hanged at Melbourne Gaol for the attempted murder of Edward Thompson near Kilmore
Michael Fennessy – 25 October 1853 – Hanged at Melbourne Gaol for murder of his wife Eliza Fennessy off Little Bourke Street
Alexander Ram – 25 October 1853 – Hanged at Melbourne Gaol for the murder of Kitty Finessy at Prahran
John Smith – 25 November 1853 – Hanged at Melbourne Gaol for being accessory to rape of Mary-Ann Brown on the Goulburn River Diggings
Joseph West – 27 December 1853 – Hanged at Melbourne Gaol for rape of eight-year-old Elizabeth Fraser near Chewton
James Button – 28 March 1854 – Bushranger. Hanged at Melbourne Gaol for Shooting With Intent on the Goulburn River Diggings
David Magee – 25 April 1854 – Hanged at Melbourne Gaol for murder of a man named McCarthy on the Avoca River
William Thoroughgood – 23 May 1854 – Hanged at Melbourne Gaol for the rape of seven-year-old Sarah Bishop
John Hughes – 25 September 1854 – Hanged At Melbourne Gaol for the murder of Abraham Marcus at Yackandandah
John Gunn – 9 November 1854 – Hanged at Geelong Gaol for the murder of Samuel Harris at Warrnambool
George (John) Roberts – 9 November 1854 – Hanged at Geelong for attempting to poison George Kelly at Native Creek, near Inverleigh
Luke Lucas – 24 November 1854 – Hanged for murder of his wife Mary off Little Bourke Street

1855 to 1859
James McAlister – 25 July 1855 – Hanged at Melbourne Gaol for murder of Jane Jones at the Exchange Hotel, Swanston Street, Melbourne
James Condon (alias Arthur Somerville) - 24 November 1855 – Bushranger. Hanged at Melbourne Gaol for Robbery With Violence near Bacchus Marsh
John Dixon – 24 November 1855 – Bushranger. Hanged at Melbourne Gaol for Robbery With Violence near Bacchus Marsh
Alfred Henry Jackson – 24 November 1855 – Bushranger. Hanged at Melbourne Gaol for Robbery With Violence near Bacchus Marsh
James Ross (alias Griffiths) – 22 April 1856 – Hanged at Geelong Gaol for the murder of his son and Eliza Sayer near Horsham
William Twigham (or Twiggem, alias Lexton) – 11 March 1857 – Hanged at Melbourne Gaol for the murder of Sergeant John McNally at the Cathcart Diggings, near Ararat
Chu-Ah-Luk 30 – 2 March 1857 – Hanged at Melbourne Gaol for the murder of Ah Pat at Campbell's Creek
James Cornick – 16 March 1857 – Hanged at Melbourne Gaol for murder of Agnes McCallum (Horne) at Eaglehawk
Frederick Turner 22 – 27 April 1857 – Bushranger. Hanged at Melbourne Gaol for Robbery Under Arms on the Flemington Road
Thomas Williams – 28 April 1857 – Hanged at Melbourne Gaol for his part in the murder of Inspector-General John Giles Price
Henry Smith (alias Brennan) – 28 April 1857 – Hanged at Melbourne Gaol for his part in the murder of Inspector-General John Giles Price
Thomas Moloney – 28 April 1857 – Hanged at Melbourne Gaol for his part in the murder of Inspector-General John Giles Price
Francis Brannigan – 29 April 1857 – Hanged at Melbourne Gaol for his part in the murder of Inspector-General John Giles Price
William Brown – 29 April 1857 – Hanged at Melbourne Gaol for his part in the murder of Inspector-General John Giles Price
Richard Bryant – 29 April 1857 – Hanged at Melbourne Gaol for his part in the murder of Inspector-General John Giles Price
John Chisley – 30 April 1857 – Hanged at Melbourne Gaol for his part in the murder of Inspector-General John Giles Price
James Woodlock – 1 June 1857 – Hanged at Melbourne Gaol for murder of Charles Vick in Castlemaine
Chong Sigh – 3 September 1857 – Hanged at Melbourne Gaol for murder of Sophia "The Chinawoman" Lewis in a brothel in Stephen Street (Exhibition Street) Melbourne
Hing Tzan – 3 September 1857 – Hanged at Melbourne Gaol for murder of Sophia Lewis in a brothel in Stephen Street (Exhibition Street) Melbourne
John Mason – 6 November 1857 – Hanged at Melbourne Gaol for murder of "Big George" Beynor at Ballan
Edward Brown – 1 March 1858 – Hanged at Melbourne Gaol for Robbery With Violence at Ararat Racecourse
William Jones – 1 March 1858 – Hanged at Melbourne Gaol for Robbery With Violence at Ararat Racecourse
George Robinson – 16 March 1858 – Hanged for the murder of Margaret Brown at Maryborough
Edward Cardana (alias John Nelson alias Michael Ferrara) – 19 March 1858 – Hanged at Bendigo for the murder of John Armstrong at Long Gully
Owen McQueeny – 20 October 1858 – Hanged at Geelong for the murder of Elizabeth Lowe near Meredith ("The Green Tent Murder")
Samuel Gibbs – 12 November 1858 – Hanged at Melbourne Gaol for the murder of his wife Anne at Ararat. This execution was botched; the rope snapped tumbling Gibbs to the floor. He had to be carried back up the scaffold and hanged again with a fresh rope.
George Thompson – 12 November 1858 – Hanged at Melbourne Gaol for the murder of Hugh Anderson at Ballarat
Edward Hitchcock – 29 November 1858 – Hanged at Melbourne Gaol for the murder of his wife Ann at Strathloddon, near Campbell's Creek. This execution was also botched; Hitchcock failed to die and remained struggling on the rope. The executioner had to grab Hitchcock by the knees and use his weight to ensure death.
Christian Von Sie (or Von See) – 29 November 1858 – Hanged at Melbourne Gaol for the murder of Martin Loemann near Mitiamo
Thomas Ryan – 11 April 1859 – Hanged at Melbourne Gaol for the murder of Joe Hartwig in the Indigo Valley
William ("Plaguey Billy") Armstrong – 12 July 1859 – Hanged at Melbourne Gaol for shooting with intent, Omeo
George ("The Butcher") Chamberlain 24 – 12 July 1859 – Hanged at Melbourne Gaol for shooting with intent, Omeo
Richard Rowley – 26 July 1859 – Hanged at Melbourne Gaol for violent assault with intent to murder his overseers at the Pentridge Stockade
William Siddons – 7 November 1859 – Hanged at Melbourne Gaol for the rape of eight-year-old Mary-Anne Smith at Doctor's Creek, near Lexton
Henry Brown – 21 November 1859 – Hanged for murder of George James Tickner at Mount Korong, near Wedderburn

1860s

1860 to 1864
George Waines -16 July 1860 – Hanged at Melbourne Gaol for the murder of Mary Hunt at Casterton
Edward Fenlow (alias Reynolds) – 20 August 1860 – Hanged at Melbourne Gaol for the murder of George Plummer (alias Gardiner) at Inglewood
John McDonald – 30 September 1860 – Hanged at Melbourne Gaol for murder of his wife Sarah at Ironbark Gully, Bendigo
William Smith – 22 April 1861 – Hanged at Melbourne Gaol for the murder of his wife Ellen near Wangaratta
Henry Cooley – 11 July 1861 – Hanged at Melbourne Gaol for murder of his wife Harriet at Heathcote
Nathaniel Horatio Ruby – 5 August 1861 – Hanged at Melbourne Gaol for the murder of Joe Watson at the Great Western Reef, Tarnagulla
Martin Rice – 30 September 1861 – Hanged at Melbourne Gaol for the murder of Anthony Green off Bourke Street, Melbourne
Thomas Sanders – 31 October 1861 – Hanged at Melbourne Gaol for the rape of Mary Egan at Keilor
Samuel Pollett – 29 December 1862 – Hanged at Melbourne Gaol for the rape of his ten-year-old daughter Sarah at Prahran
Thomas McGee – 19 February 1863 – Hanged at Melbourne Gaol for the murder of Alexander Brown at Maiden Gully
James Murphy – 6 November 1863 – Hanged at Geelong for the murder of Senior Constable Daniel O'Boyle at Warrnambool
Julian Cross – 11 November 1863 – From Macao. Hanged at Melbourne Gaol for the murder of Robert Scott in the Wappan district (near Mansfield)
David Gedge – 11 November 1863 – Hanged at Melbourne Gaol for the murder of Robert Scott in the Wappan district (near Mansfield)
Elizabeth Scott – 11 November 1863 – Hanged at Melbourne Gaol for the murder of her husband in the Wappan district (near Mansfield)
James Barrett (also called Birmingham) – 1 December 1863 - Hanged at Melbourne Gaol for the murder of Elizabeth Beckinsale at Woodstock
Alexander Davis – 29 February 1864 – Hanged at Ballarat Gaol for the murder of George Sims at Smythesdale
William Carver (also called Thornby, Foster) – 3 August 1864 – Hanged at Melbourne Gaol for an attempted bank robbery at Fitzroy
Samuel Woods (also called Abraham Salmonie) – 3 August 1864 - Hanged at Melbourne Gaol for Shooting With Intent in an attempted bank robbery at Fitzroy
Christopher Harrison – 3 August 1864 – Hanged at Melbourne Gaol for the murder of James Marsh in William St.

1865 to 1869
John Stacey (real name Casey) – 5 April 1865 – Hanged at Melbourne Gaol for the murder of two-year-old Danny Gleeson at South Melbourne
Joseph ("Quiet Joe") Brown – 4 May 1865 – Hanged at Melbourne Gaol for the murder of Emmanuel "Dodger" Jacobs at the Whittington Tavern, Bourke Street Melbourne
Peter Dotsalaere – 6 July 1865 – Hanged at Melbourne Gaol for the murder of Catherine Jacobs at 106 LaTrobe Street Melbourne
David Young – 21 August 1865 – Hanged at Castlemaine Gaol for the murder of Margaret Graham at Daylesford
Thomas ("Yankee Tom") Menard – 28 October 1865 – Hanged at Geelong for the murder of James Sweeney at Warrnambool
Patrick Sheehan – 6 November 1865 – Hanged at Beechworth for the murder of James Kennedy at Rowdy Flat Yackandandah
Long Poy – 10 March 1866 – Hanged at Castlemaine for the murder of Ah Yong at Emu Flat
James Jones – 19 March 1866 – Hanged at Ballarat for the murder of Dr Julius Saenger, committed at Scarsdale
Robert Bourke (alias Cluskey) – 29 November 1866 – Bushranger. Hanged at Melbourne Gaol for the murder of Harry Facey Hurst at Diamond Creek
Denis Murphy – 16 April 1867 – Hanged at Ballarat for the murder of Patrick O'Meara at Bullarook
John Kelly – 4 May 1867 – Hanged at Beechworth for sodomy on eighteen-month-old James Strack at Wangaratta
William Terry – 31 July 1867 – Hanged at Castlemaine for the murder of a man named Peter Reddick or Redyk on the Coliban near Taradale
George Searle – 7 August 1867 – Hanged at Ballarat for the murder of Thomas Burke at Piggoreet
Joseph Ballan – 7 August 1867 – Hanged at Ballarat for the murder of Thomas Burke at Piggoreet
Bernard Cunningham – 31 March 1868 – Confederate Army veteran. Hanged at Melbourne Gaol for the murder of John Fairweather at Green Gully, near Keilor
Joseph Whelan – 31 March 1868 – Hanged at Melbourne Gaol for the murder of farmer Tom Branley at Rokewood
John Hogan – 14 August 1868 – Hanged at Castlemaine for the murder of Martin Rooney, committed at Bullock Creek, outside Marong
Michael Flannigan (Flannagan) – 31 March 1869 – Hanged at Melbourne Gaol for the murder of Sgt Thomas Hull at Hamilton
James Ritson – 3 August 1869 – Hanged at Melbourne Gaol for the murder of the Methodist Minister William Hill, who was visiting him at A Division, Pentridge
Peter Higgins (alias James Smith) – 11 November 1869 – Hanged at Beechworth for the murder of his wife Elizabeth Wheelahan near Springhurst

1870s

Ah Pew – 23 May 1870 – Hanged at Castlemaine for the murder of nine-year-old Elizabeth Hunt at Glenluce, near Vaughan
Patrick Smith – 4 August 1870 – Hanged at Melbourne Gaol for the murder of his wife Mary at North Melbourne
Andrew Vair (Vere) – 15 August 1870 – Hanged at Ararat for murder of Amos Cheale at St Arnaud
James Cusack – 30 August 1870 – Hanged at Melbourne Gaol for the murder of his wife Anne at Woods Point
James Seery – 14 November 1870 – Hanged at Melbourne Gaol for the murder of August Tepfar at Crooked River, Gippsland
James Quinn – 10 November 1871 – Hanged at Beechworth for the murder of Ah Woo, near Myrtleford
Patrick Geary – 4 December 1871 – Hanged at Melbourne Gaol for the murder of a shepherd named Thomas Brookhouse near Colac in 1854
Edward Feeney – 14 May 1872 – Hanged at Melbourne Gaol for the murder of Charles Marks in the Treasury Gardens
James Wilkie – 20 May 1872 – Hanged at Castlemaine for the murder of Henry Pensom at Daylesford
Samuel Wright – 11 March 1873 – Hanged at Castlemaine for the attempted murder of Arthur Hagan (or Hogan) at Dead Horse Flat, near Eaglehawk
Thomas Brady – 12 May 1873 – Hanged at Beechworth for the murder of John Watt ("The Wooragee Murder")
James Smith – 12 May 1873 – Hanged at Beechworth for the murder of John Watt ("The Wooragee Murder")
Pierre Borbun (Barburn, Borhuu) – 20 May 1873 – Hanged at Castlemaine for the murder of Sarah Smith, the publican's wife at the White Swan Hotel, Sunrise Gully, Kangaroo Flat
Oscar (or Hasker) Wallace - 11 August 1873 - Hanged at Ballarat for the rape of Mary Cook at Mount Beckworth, near Clunes
Ah Kat (Ah Cat) – 9 August 1875 – Hanged at Castlemaine for the murder of Friedrich Renzelmann at Bet Bet, near Dunolly
An Gaa – 30 August 1875 – Hanged at Melbourne Gaol for the murder of Pooey Waugh, committed at Vaughan
Henry Howard – 4 October 1875 – Hanged at Melbourne Gaol for the murder of Elizabeth Wright, licensee of the Frankston Hotel
John Weachurch (alias Taylor) – 6 December 1875 – Hanged at Melbourne Gaol for attempted murder of Warder Patrick Moran
John Duffus – 22 May 1876 – Hanged at Castlemaine, having been handed in by his wife for the rape of his eleven-year-old daughter Mary Ann near Goornong
James ("Donegal Jim") Ashe – 21 August 1876 – Hanged at Ballarat for the rape of Elizabeth Reece at Burrumbeet
Basileo Bondietto – 11 December 1876 – Hanged at Melbourne Gaol for the murder of Carlo Comisto near Tallarook
William Hastings – 14 March 1877 – Hanged at Melbourne Gaol for the murder of his wife Annie near Mount Eliza
Thomas Hogan – 9 June 1879 – Hanged at Beechworth for fratricide at Bundalong, near Yarrawonga

1880s

Ned Kelly – 11 November 1880 – Bushranger. Hanged at Melbourne Gaol for the murder of Constable Thomas Lonigan
Robert Rohan – 6 June 1881 – Hanged at Beechworth for the murder of John Shea at Yalca
Robert Francis Burns – 25 September 1883 – Confessed to eight murders. Hanged at Ararat for the murder of Michael Quinliven at Wickliffe
Henry Morgan – 6 June 1884 – Hanged at Ararat for the rape and murder of ten-year-old Margaret Nolan at Panmure
James Hawthorn – 21 August 1884 – Hanged at Melbourne Gaol for fratricide at Brighton
William O'Brien – 24 October 1884 – Hanged at Melbourne Gaol for the murder of farmer Peter McAinsh at Lancefield
William Barnes – 15 May 1885 – Hanged at Melbourne Gaol for the murder of Joe Slack at South Melbourne
Charles Bushby (alias Baker) – 3 September 1885 – Hanged at Ballarat for attempted murder of Det Sgt Richard Hyland near Gong Gong
Edward ("The Fiddler") Hunter – 27 November 1885 – Hanged at Bendigo Prison for the murder of Jim Power at the Golden Fleece Hotel, Charlton
Freeland Morell – 7 January 1886 – Hanged at Melbourne Gaol for murder of fellow sailor John Anderson on the docks at Port Melbourne
George Syme – 9 November 1888 – Hanged at Melbourne Gaol for the murder of his mother-in-law Margaret Clifford at Lilydale
William Harrison – 18 March 1889 – Hanged at Bendigo for the murder of 'Corky Jack' Duggan at Elmore
Filipe Castillo – 16 September 1889 – Hanged at Melbourne Gaol for the murder of Annie Thornton at North Carlton
Robert Landells – 16 October 1889 – Hanged at Melbourne Gaol for the murder of Peter Sherlock at Chamber's Paddock, about 6 km from Ringwood

1890s

John Thomas Phelan – 16 March 1891 – Hanged at Melbourne Gaol for the murder of his de facto wife Ada Hatton at St.James' Place (now Ellis St) South Yarra
John Wilson – 23 March 1891 – Hanged at Melbourne Gaol for the murder of his fiancée Estella Marks at Darling Gardens, Clifton Hill
Cornelius Bourke – 20 April 1891 – Hanged at Ballarat for the murder of an elderly prisoner named Peter Stewart in the gaol at Hamilton
Fatta Chand – 27 April 1891 – Hanged at Melbourne Gaol for the murder of Juggo Mull at Healesville
Frank Spearin (also called John Wilson) – 11 May 1891 – Hanged at Ballarat for the rape of six-year-old Adeline Shepherd at Eastern Oval, Ballarat
James Johnston – 18 May 1891 – Hanged at Ballarat Gaol for murdering his wife Mary and their four children in Drummond Street North, Ballarat
William Coulston (Colston) – 21 August 1891 – Hanged at Melbourne Gaol for the murder of Mary & William Davis at Narbethong
Frederick Bailey Deeming – Murdered at least six people. Hanged at Melbourne Gaol for the murder of Emily Mather at Windsor – 23 May 1892
John Conder – 28 August 1893 – Hanged at Melbourne Gaol for the murder of Karamjit Singh near Buchan
Frances Knorr – 15 January 1894 – "The Brunswick Baby Farmer" – Hanged at Melbourne Gaol for the murder of two infants
Ernest Knox – 19 March 1894 – Hanged at Melbourne Gaol for the murder of Isaac Crawcour while in the act of burglary at Williamstown
Frederick Jordan – 20 August 1894 – African American immigrant, hanged at Melbourne Gaol for the murder of his girlfriend Minnie Crabtree at Port Melbourne
Martha Needle – 22 October 1894 – Murdered five people by poison. Hanged at Melbourne Gaol for the murder of Louis Juncken at 137 Bridge Road Richmond
Elijah Cockroft – 12 November 1894 – Hanged at Ballarat for the murder of Fanny Mutt at Noradjuha, near Natimuk
Arthur Buck – 1 July 1895 – Hanged at Melbourne Gaol for the murder of Catherine Norton at South Melbourne
Emma Williams – 4 November 1895 – Hanged at Melbourne Gaol for the murder of her two-year-old son John at Port Melbourne
Charles Henry Strange – 13 January 1896 – Hanged at Melbourne Gaol for the murder of Fred Dowse at Lakes Entrance
Charles John Hall – 13 September 1897 – Hanged at Bendigo for the murder of his wife Minnie at Eaglehawk
Alfred Archer – 21 November 1898 – Hanged at Melbourne Gaol for the murder of William Matthews at Strathmerton

1900s to 1920s

William Robert Jones – 26 March 1900 – Hanged at Melbourne Gaol for murdering eight-year-old Rita Jones at Broadford
Albert Edward McNamara – 14 April 1902 – Hanged at Melbourne Gaol for arson causing death of his four-year-old son Bert at Carlton
August Tisler (Sippol) – 20 October 1902 – Hanged at Melbourne Gaol for the murder of Edward Sangal at Dandenong
James Coleman Williams – 8 September 1904 – Hanged at Melbourne Gaol for the murder of his employer's wife Mary Veitch at O'Grady Street Clifton Hill
Charles Deutschmann – 29 June 1908 – Hanged at Ballarat for the murder of his wife Isabella Deutschmann at Dobie, near Ararat
Joseph Pfeiffer – 29 April 1912 – Hanged at Melbourne Gaol for shooting his sister-in-law Florence Whitely at 102 Mills Street, Middle Park
John Jackson – 24 January 1916 – Hanged at Melbourne Gaol for the murder of Constable David McGrath while in the act of robbing the Trades Hall
Antonio Picone – 18 September 1916 – Hanged at Melbourne Gaol for the murder of Giuseppe Lauricella at Queen Victoria Market
Albert Edward Budd (39) – 29 January 1918 – Hanged at Melbourne Gaol for the murder of his foster-sister Annie Samson at Port Melbourne
George Farrow Blunderfield – 15 April 1918 – Hanged at Melbourne Gaol for the murder of mother and daughter Margaret & Rose Taylor at Trawool
Colin Campbell Ross – 24 April 1922 – Hanged at Melbourne Gaol for the Gun Alley Murder. Posthumously pardoned in 2007, the only instance of a pardon for a judicially executed person in Australia
Angus Murray (real name Henry Donnelly) – 14 April 1924 – Hanged at Melbourne Gaol for the murder of Thomas Berriman at Glenferrie Station, frequent accomplice of Robert David Bennett

1930s to 1960s

David Bennett – 26 September 1932 – Hanged at Pentridge Prison for the rape of a four-year-old girl at North Carlton (sentenced to death for a similar offence in WA in 1911). The first execution at Pentridge. The last person to be executed in Australia for a crime other than murder.
Arnold Sodeman – 1 June 1936 – "The Schoolgirl Strangler" – Confessed to the murder of four girls. Hanged at Pentridge.
Edward Cornelius – 22 June 1936 – Hanged at Pentridge for the murder of the Reverend Laceby Cecil at St. Saviour's Collingwood ("The Vicarage Murder").
Thomas William ('Nugget') Johnson – 23 January 1939 – Hanged at Pentridge for the murder of Charles Bunney and Robert Gray at the former Windsor Castle Hotel, Dunolly.
George Green – 17 April 1939 – Hanged at Pentridge for the murder of Phyllis and Annie Wiseman at Glenroy.
Alfred Bye – 22 December 1941 – Hanged at Pentridge for stabbing to death Thomas Walker off Treasury Place. Bye took over twenty-two minutes to die.
Eddie Leonski – 9 November 1942 – "The Brownout Strangler" – Hanged at Pentridge for the murders of Ivy McLeod (at Victoria Avenue, Albert Park), Pauline Thompson (at Spring Street, Melbourne) and Gladys Hosking (at Gatehouse Street, Parkville). Leonski was executed under the jurisdiction of the U.S. military.
Jean Lee – 19 February 1951 – Hanged at Pentridge for the murder of 'Pop' Kent in Dorrit Street, Carlton. The last woman executed in Australia.
Norman Andrews – 19 February 1951 – Hanged at Pentridge for the murder of 'Pop' Kent.
Robert David Clayton – 19 February 1951 – Hanged at Pentridge for the murder of 'Pop' Kent.
Ronald Ryan – 3 February 1967 – Hanged at Pentridge for the murder of Prison Officer George Hodson. The last person executed in Australia.

References

Further reading 
 Heaton, J.H. Australian Dictionary of Dates and Men of the Time, S.W. Silver & Son, London, 1879. Part 2, pages 90–94.

Australian crime-related lists
Executed
Australia
 
Executions
Executions
executed